Meet Mr. Penny is a 1938 British comedy film directed by David MacDonald and starring Richard Goolden, Vic Oliver and Fabia Drake. It was made at Welwyn Studios by British National Films.

Cast
 Richard Goolden as Henry Penny  
 Vic Oliver as Allgood  
 Fabia Drake as Annie Penny  
 Kay Walsh as Peggy Allgood  
 Patrick Barr as Clive Roberts  
 Hermione Gingold as Mrs. Wilson  
 Wilfrid Hyde-White as Mr. Wilson  
 Charles Farrell as Jackson  
 Hal Walters as Cecil  
 Joss Ambler as Gridley  
 Jack Raine as Preston  
 Renee Gadd as Mrs. Brown  
 Tom Gill 
 Daphne Raglan 
 Gilbert Davis

References

Bibliography
 Low, Rachael. Filmmaking in 1930s Britain. George Allen & Unwin, 1985.
 Wood, Linda. British Films, 1927-1939. British Film Institute, 1986.

External links

1938 films
British comedy films
1938 comedy films
Films shot at Welwyn Studios
Films directed by David MacDonald (director)
British black-and-white films
1930s English-language films
1930s British films